Johannes Petri (1441 Langendorf – 29 April 1511 Basel) a printer in Basel and the founder of the oldest existing publishing house in 1488.

Education and early life 
Johannes Petri was born in 1441 in Langendorf in Lower Franconia. It is assumed that in a monastery he learned to read and Latin. Following he moved to the nearby Amorbach where he met Johann Welcker, who would later become his printing partner in Basel. He then moved on to Mainz, where he trained in a print workshop. Later he might have met the German printer Anton Koberger in Nuremberg and he printed his first book in Augsburg. He then travelled to Freiburg where he sold the books, and found work as a scribe. In about 1480, he shall have come to Basel, where he was employed by Johann Amorbach who had come into ownership of two houses in the Rhine Alley.

In Basel 
In 1488 he becomes a citizen of Basel, two weeks later he enters the Guild of Saffron which permitted him to open his own workshop in the Ackermanshof in St.Johanns Vorstadt. He closely cooperated with the fellow printers Johann Amerbach and Johann Froben, and the trio would become well known as Die Drei Hannsen (The three Hannsen, Hanns as abr. of Johannes). Most of his prints were cooperations with the two, except for an edition of the collected works from Ambrose of 1506. The edition of 1978 pages and three volumes counted with an index and is the only recorded work for which Johannes Petri is mentioned as the sole printer. Its editor was Conrad Leontorius. An other accomplishment was the printing of the collected works of Augustine, which was a major project for which the three Hannsen joined forces for three years. The Augustine edition was also published in 1506 and 1600 exemplars were shipped to Anton Koberger of Nuremberg. From 1509, the first printers-mark of Johannes Petri depicting a Basilisk holding the coats of Arms from Basel is known. In 1511, he transfers his printshop to his nephew Adam Petri.

Personal life 
He married Barbara Mellinger, the daughter of the owner of the Ackermanshof. and also the Vogt of Birseck in 1500. The marriage took place in the Church of the Karthäuser. The two became the parents of six children. With time, he bought the house adjacent of the Ackermanshof from where at the time one could see the hills of the Black Forest. In 1505, he was excepted from military service in return of providing a replacement. Johannes Petri died on the 29 April 1511 and was buried in the cemetery of the Preachers Church in Basel. An epitaph composed by Beatus Rhenanus was added to his grave on request of Johannes Froben. His wife Barbara would die shortly after and their three children and the printing workshop would later be entrusted to Johannes Froben.

References 

1441 births
1511 deaths
German printers
Swiss printers